Myristica grandifolia is a species of plant in the family Myristicaceae. It is endemic to Fiji.

References

Endemic flora of Fiji
grandifolia
Least concern plants
Taxonomy articles created by Polbot